Zagłębie in Polish means coalfield. It can refer to:

Górnośląskie Zagłębie Węglowe, a mining region
Zagłębie Dąbrowskie, a mining region
Zagłębie Sosnowiec, an association football club
Zagłębie Lubin, an association football club
Zagłębie Wałbrzych, an association football club
Zagłębie Steelers, a Polish club of American football 
KH Zagłębie Sosnowiec an ice hockey club
MKS Zagłębie Lubin, a women's handball team